Bhaura may refer to:
 Bhaura, Nawanshahr, a village in Punjab, India
 Kulbir Bhaura, Indian field hockey player
 Jathedar Sadhu Singh Bhaura, Indian Sikh missionary
 Bhan Singh Bhaura (1934–2004), Indian politician

See also
 Bhaurao